The men's 56 kg weightlifting competitions at the 1964 Summer Olympics in Tokyo took place on 11 October at the Shibuya Public Hall. It was the fifth appearance of the bantamweight class.

Results

References

Weightlifting at the 1964 Summer Olympics